Hockey Novara is a Roller Hockey team from Novara, Italy. It was founded in 1924 and interrupted the activities in 2009.

Honours

National
Serie A1 italian championship: 32 (italian record)
 1930, 1931, 1932, 1933, 1934, 1936, 1946, 1947, 1949, 1950, 1958, 1959, 1969, 1970, 1971, 1972, 1973, 1974, 1975, 1977, 1985, 1987, 1988, 1993, 1994, 1995, 1997, 1998, 1999, 2000, 2001, 2002
Coppa Italia: 20 (italian record)
 1966, 1967, 1969, 1970, 1972, 1976, 1985, 1986, 1987, 1988, 1993, 1994, 1995, 1996, 1997, 1998, 1999, 2000, 2001, 2002 
Coppa di Lega: 3 (italian record)
 1999, 2000, 2001

International
World Skate Europe Cup: 3
1985, 1992, 1993

Roller hockey clubs in Italy
Sports clubs established in 1924